The 2022 Racing Louisville FC season was the club's second season of play. Racing Louisville competes in the National Women's Soccer League, the top flight of professional women's soccer in the United States. The club finished 9th in the 12-team league's regular season and failed to qualify for the playoffs, was eliminated during the group stage of the 2022 NWSL Challenge Cup, and were runners-up in the 2022 The Women's Cup hosted by the club.

Background 

In its inaugural season, Racing Louisville built a squad from the 2020 NWSL Expansion Draft, the 2021 NWSL Draft, a series of free agent signings, and international transfers after the opening of the season under first head coach Christy Holly. After two losses and two draws to open the campaign in the 2021 NWSL Challenge Cup, Racing Louisville experienced an up-and-down 2021 NWSL season which saw the club finish 9th in the 10-team league and miss the playoffs.

The club's greatest success in the first year was as host of an inaugural international competition called The Women's Cup, a 4-team mid-season competition won by Racing Louisville with a defeat of FC Bayern Munich on penalties.

In the middle of the season on August 31, 2022, the club fired Holly for cause and installed Mario Sanchez as interim head coach. On December 9, after the season concluded, the club announced the hiring of Kim Björkegren as the second permanent head coach of Racing Louisville.

The 2021 NWSL Championship, originally planned to be played in Portland, Oregon, was moved by the league on October 13, 2022, to Racing Louisville's home ground of Lynn Family Stadium following player complaints regarding the artificial turf at Providence Park and the 9 a.m. local kickoff time required to meet television obligations. The match, played on November 20, 2022, was won by the Washington Spirit over the Chicago Red Stars before 10,300 attending fans, a record for a women's soccer match in the venue.

Current squad 
Several players departed from Racing Louisville's 2021 squad after the season ended. Aside from free transfers, Racing traded Savannah McCaskill to Angel City FC, Julia Ashley was sent to Houston Dash, Yuki Nagasato was traded back to Chicago Red Stars, and Kaleigh Riehl was selected by San Diego Wave FC in the 2022 NWSL Expansion Draft. Louisville traded Cece Kizer and Addisyn Merrick to their hometown club of Kansas City, and Ebony Salmon to Houston Dash, while also waiving Erin Simon, who was subsequently signed by Leicester City W.F.C. on a free transfer.

Racing Louisville traded the rights to Christen Press to Angel City FC in exchange for expansion draft protection, the rights to Janine Beckie to Portland Thorns FC in exchange for allocation money, and the rights to Tobin Heath to OL Reign for allocation money and draft picks.

Racing Louisville reloaded primarily through the 2022 NWSL Draft, bringing Jaelin Howell, Savannah DeMelo, and Jordyn Bloomer into the squad. Louisville acquired Jess McDonald through a trade with North Carolina Courage, signed 2021 draftees Kirsten Davis and Parker Goins, and signed free agents Hillary Beall, Taylor Malham, Julia Lester, Rebecca Holloway, Alex Chidiac, Satara Murray, and Thembi Kgatlana to pro contracts. Following FIFA's ruling that foreign player contracts with Russian clubs were voidable in the wake of the Russian invasion of Ukraine, Sh'Nia Gordon left CSKA Moscow and signed with Racing Louisville.

On July 27, 2022, Racing announced that Gordon and Taylor Otto had mutually terminated their contracts with the club to pursue playing opportunities in Europe, and that National Team Replacement player Zaneta Wyne had signed a contract through 2023. The club did not offer permanent contracts to its other National Team Replacement players — Hannah Adler, Isabella Beletic, and Allison Whitfield.

On August 1, 2022, Racing traded $30,000 of allocation money and a fourth-round pick in the 2023 NWSL Draft to OL Reign for the discovery rights to sign China women's national football team forward Wang Shuang to an NWSL contract. On August 10, after Wang received her visa, the club announced that it had signed Wang to a contract through the 2023 season.

On August 15, 2022, Racing announced the transfer of goalkeeper Kelsey Daugherty from Djurgårdens IF. Per a club statement, Björkegren said the signing would allow the club to loan out backup goalkeepers Beall and Bloomer.

On September 7, 2022, Racing announced the transfer of midfielder Freja Olofsson to Real Madrid four months into her three-year contract with Racing, in exchange for an undisclosed transfer fee.

Racing announced the loan of goalkeeper Hillary Beall to Adelaide United FC, from the end of the NWSL season to the end of the A-League Women season in April, on September 27, 2022.

Competitions

Preseason friendlies 
All preseason friendlies for this Racing Louisville season were closed to the public with results not published.

NWSL Challenge Cup

Match results

NWSL Regular Season

Following their loss to the North Carolina Courage on September 10, Racing were eliminated from NWSL playoff contention.

Standings

Results summary

Match results
The 2022 NWSL Season will feature 12 teams with the addition of expansion sides Angel City FC and San Diego Wave FC. All clubs will play a balanced schedule with one home match and one away match against all others.

The Women's Cup

NWSL Playoffs 

Racing Louisville FC finished 9th in the regular season and did not qualify for the 2022 NWSL Playoffs.

Player statistics 

Source: NWSLsoccer.com

Goals 
Matches as of October 1, 2022.

Assists 
Matches as of October 1, 2022.

Clean sheets 
Matches as of October 1, 2022.

Disciplinary 
Matches as of October 1, 2022.

References

External links 
 Racing Louisville FC

Racing Louisville FC seasons
Racing Louisville FC
Racing Louisville FC
Racing Louisville FC